Cyrtopodion belaense is a species of gecko, a lizard in the family Gekkonidae. The species is endemic to southern Pakistan.

References

Further reading
Nazarov, Roman A.; Anajeva, Natalia B.; Papenfuss, Theodore J. (2011). "A New Species of Thin-Toed Geckos Cyrtopodion sensu lato (Squamata: Sauria: Gekkonidae) from Balochistan Province, South Pakistan". Russian Journal of Herpetology 18 (2): 130–136. (Cyrtopodion belaense, new species).

Cyrtopodion
Reptiles described in 2011